Samuel Nixon House is a historic plantation house located near Hertford, Perquimans County, North Carolina.   It was built about 1790, and is a -story, frame dwelling with a gambrel roof and double-shouldered end chimney. It features a full-width front porch and one-story shed additions at the front and rear.

The house was added to the National Register of Historic Places in 1974.

References

Plantation houses in North Carolina
Houses on the National Register of Historic Places in North Carolina
Houses completed in 1790
Houses in Perquimans County, North Carolina
National Register of Historic Places in Perquimans County, North Carolina